Redmond Barry is a dual player from County Wexford. He played with both the Wexford football & hurling teams in the 2000s.

This time has been a successful one for the football team. In 2005 he helped them to a Div 1 National Football League final for the first time in over 50 years but lost out to Armagh on the day. In 2008 Wexford were back in the National League final this time in Div 3 which they won, they later made it to the Leinster Final for the first time since the 1950s and the All Ireland Semi Final for the first time since the 1940s.

He plays at club level with the St Anne's club and has won County Championships in both football and hurling. He has also played with UCD and won a Dublin Hurling Championship with them.

In November 2013, Barry announced his retirement from inter-county football.

In 2014 he joined the Wexford Intermediate hurling team, where scored the winning goal against Kilkenny in the Leinster final.

Honours
 Leinster Senior Hurling Championship (1): 2004
 Fitzgibbon Cup (1): 2001
 Wexford Senior Hurling Championship (1): 2000
 Wexford Senior Football Championship (3): 2000, 2001, 2012
 Dublin Senior Hurling Championship (1): 2000

References

 'I'm staying put' - Red - Hoganstand.com
 Barry to bar one code - Hoganstand.com
 Barry receives high praise - Hoganstand.com

Year of birth missing (living people)
Living people
Dual players
St Anne's (Wexford) Gaelic footballers
St Anne's (Wexford) hurlers
UCD Gaelic footballers
UCD hurlers
Wexford inter-county Gaelic footballers
Wexford inter-county hurlers